Gladsome, Humour & Blue is the second album from Martin Stephenson and the Daintees.

Track listing
All songs written and composed by Martin Stephenson.
 "There Comes A Time" - 04:08
 "Slaughterman" - 04:01
 "The Wait" - 03:51
 "I Can See" - 05:08
 "The Old Church is Still Standing" - 02:53
 "Even The Night" - 03:43
 "Wholly Humble Heart" - 05:20
 "Me and Mathew" - 03:49
 "Nancy" - 03:46
 "Goodbye John" - 03:46
 "I Pray" - 06:13

Personnel
Martin Stephenson – Lead Vocals, Guitars
Anthony Dunn – Bass
Paul Smith – Drums
Gary Dunn - Lead Guitar 
Mickey Watson - Keyboards, Sax 
Sherryl Parker - Backing Vocals 
Sheila Parker - Backing vocals 
Pandit Dinesh - Percussion 
Anne Stephenson - Violin 
Virginia Astley - Flute, Backing vocals

References

1988 albums
Martin Stephenson and the Daintees albums